Quintus Valerius Falto was a Roman politician in the 3rd century BC. Quintus was elected consul in 239 BC alongside Gaius Mamilius Turrinus. He was the brother of his successor, the consul Publius Valerius Falto who served in 238 BC.

Falto was also the first Praetor Peregrinus at Rome in 242 BC, the development of which was occasioned by the war with Carthage which required a second Praetor, but the consul of the year, Aulus Postumius Albinus, was not allowed to leave the city because he was also a priest of Mars. After his superior, Gaius Lutatius Catulus, was injured at the Siege of Drepana, Falto took over command of the Roman forces. He conducted himself with such bearing that, on his return, he demanded to share in the triumph to which Catulus was entitled. His claim was rejected on the grounds that he was an inferior officer. However, after arbitration under Aulus Atilius Calatinus which, again, ruled against him, the people insisted Falto deserved the honor, and so his triumph was held on 6 October 241 BC.

References 

Roman patricians
3rd-century BC Roman consuls
Falto, Quintus